Dariusz Pawłowski (born 25 February 1999) is a Polish professional footballer who plays as a right-back for I liga club Sandecja Nowy Sącz, on loan from Radomiak Radom.

References

External links

1999 births
Living people
Polish footballers
Association football defenders
Górnik Zabrze players
Bruk-Bet Termalica Nieciecza players
Radomiak Radom players
Sandecja Nowy Sącz players
Ekstraklasa players
I liga players
III liga players
Sportspeople from Zabrze